"Into You" is the third single from American rapper Fabolous's second studio album, Street Dreams (2003), featuring either Ashanti or Tamia. The song also appears on Tamia's album More. "Into You" originally featured Ashanti, but after Irv Gotti of Murder Inc. Records refused to let her film a music video to promote the single, Fabolous reached out to Tamia to re-record a commercial version. Both the album and single versions received heavy radio-play, resulting in all three artists being credited on the US Billboard Hot 100.

Based on Tamia's 1998 single "So Into You", which samples the Commodores' song "Say Yeah", "Into You" reached number four on the Billboard Hot 100, becoming the second single from the album to reach the top 10, after "Can't Let You Go". The song stayed on the Hot 100 throughout 2003, finishing at number 23 on the chart's year-end edition. The single also reached number four in Australia and entered the top 40 in Ireland, the Netherlands, and the United Kingdom.

Music video
The music video for the single is 4 minutes and 20 seconds long and was originally supposed to have Ashanti in it, but because Irv Gotti refused to allow Ashanti to shoot the video, Fabolous and his record label were forced to go with Tamia for the video instead. The video was shot primarily on a beach, for a summer vibe to keep the single hot and make it a summer hit, even though the song itself was released in March. K. D. Aubert also makes a cameo in the video as his love interest.

Track listings

US 12-inch single
A1. "Into You" (main mix original)
A2. "Into You" (main mix amended)
B1. "Into You" (instrumental)
B2. "Into You" (acapella)

Australian CD single
 "Into You" (amended version)
 "Into You" (explicit version)
 "Young'n" (explicit version)
 "Keepin' It Gangsta" (explicit version)

European CD single
 "Into You" (main mix radio edit)
 "Into You" (main mix explicit version)

UK CD single
 "Into You" (main mix radio edit)
 "Into You" (main mix explicit version)
 "Young'n" (album version)
 "Into You" (video)

UK 12-inch single
A1. "Into You" (main mix amended version)
A2. "Into You" (main mix explicit version)
B1. "Call Me" (explcit version)

Charts

Weekly charts

Year-end charts

Certifications

Release history

References

2003 singles
2003 songs
Ashanti (singer) songs
Elektra Records singles
Fabolous songs
Songs written by Bob Robinson (songwriter)
Songs written by Fabolous
Songs written by Lionel Richie
Songs written by Tamia
Songs written by Tim Kelley
Tamia songs

ro:Into You